Arthur Adamson (10 January 1882 – 16 July 1966) was an Australian rules football player who played 28 games and scored no goals for the South Melbourne Football Club in the 1902 and 1903 seasons. He was recruited from Broken Hill.

Notes

References
 South Melbourne Team, Melbourne Punch, (Thursday, 4 June 1903), p.16.

External links

1903 - South Melbourne FC team photo

1882 births
1966 deaths
Sydney Swans players
Australian rules footballers from New South Wales